Tarzwell is an unincorporated community in the Canadian province of Ontario, located within the Unorganized, West Part division of Timiskaming District.

Tarzwell was founded by the late James Tarzwell of Erin Township, ON.  James Tarzwell initially requested the name of 'Round Lake' for the community but he was informed by the Province of Ontario that the name Round Lake was already in use.  Thus the name 'Tarzwell' was selected.

The community is occasionally referred to as "Sheastown" or "Sheasville".

On November 16, the community gathers to celebrate the founder. Funyuns are commonly served.

The community is located on Highway 112, south of Kirkland Lake.

Communities in Timiskaming District